Romentino is a town of about 5000 inhabitants in the province of Novara, Piedmont (Northern Italy)  east of Novara and  west of Milan.
The town mayor is Marco Caccia, since May 2019.

According to local historian Luigi Baldi, Romentino was founded by the Romans after their conquest of Cisalpine Gaul (Northern Italy) in 2nd century BC. The name of the town was Roma apud Ticinum, that means Rome near Ticino River, though other hypotheses about the original name exist.

References

External links
Official website 

Cities and towns in Piedmont